Phylloxera is a genus of true bugs belonging to the family Phylloxeridae.

The species of this genus are found in Europe and Northern America.

Species:

Phylloxera caryaeavellana 
Phylloxera caryaecaulis 
Phylloxera caryaefallax 
Phylloxera caryaefoliae 
Phylloxera caryaeglobuli 
Phylloxera caryaegummosa 
Phylloxera caryaeren 
Phylloxera caryaescissa 
Phylloxera caryaesemen 
Phylloxera caryaesepta 
Phylloxera caryaevenae 
Phylloxera castaneae 
Phylloxera castaneivora 
Phylloxera coccinea 
Phylloxera confusa 
Phylloxera conica 
Phylloxera corticalis 
Phylloxera davidsoni 
Phylloxera deplanata 
Phylloxera depressa 
Phylloxera devastatrix 
Phylloxera foae 
Phylloxera foveata 
Phylloxera foveola 
Phylloxera georgiana 
Phylloxera glabra 
Phylloxera globosa 
Phylloxera ilicis 
Phylloxera intermedia 
Phylloxera italica 
Phylloxera kunugi 
Phylloxera minima 
Phylloxera notabilis 
Phylloxera perniciosa 
Phylloxera picta 
Phylloxera pilosula 
Phylloxera querceti 
Phylloxera quercina 
Phylloxera quercus 
Phylloxera reticulata 
Phylloxera rileyi 
Phylloxera rimosalis 
Phylloxera russellae 
Phylloxera similans 
Phylloxera spinifera 
Phylloxera spinosa 
Phylloxera spinuloides 
Phylloxera stanfordiana 
Phylloxera stellata 
Phylloxera subelliptica 
Phylloxera symmetrica 
Phylloxera texana 
Phylloxera tuberculifera

References

Phylloxeridae